PBAC may refer to:

 Pakistan - Britain Advisory Council, a group was established on 7 January 2002
 Pharmaceutical Benefits Advisory Committee, the committee that makes recommendations to the Australian Minister for Health and Ageing regarding drugs which should be made available as pharmaceutical benefits
 Palm Beach Atlantic University, formerly Palm Beach Atlantic College
 Policy-based access control, a means to achieve fine-grained access control in software engineering.